The following is a timeline of the history of the city of Accra, Ghana.

17th–19th centuries

 1610 – Okai Koi in power in Ga territory.
 1649 – Fort Crèvecœur built by the Dutch West India Company.
 1661 – Fort Christiansborg built by the Dutch trader Henry Caerlof in Osu.
 1673 – Fort James built by the English.
 1680 – Akwamu in power in Ga territory.
 1807 – Slave trade abolished.
 1850 – Dutch Fort Crèvecœur ceded to British control.
 1851 – Denmark sells its forts to Britain.
 1871 – The Netherlands sells its forts to Britain.
 1871 – Jamestown Light built at Fort James.
 1874 – British capture Accra.
 1876 – Capital of British Gold Coast relocated to Accra from Cape Coast.
 1883 – N. Walwin Holm photography studio established.
 1889 – Lutterodt photo studio in business (approximate date).
 1894 – Holy Trinity Cathedral (Accra) construction begins.
 1896 – Bank of British West Africa branch established.
 1898 – Accra Town Council established.

20th century

 1908 – Town boundaries expanded.
 1909 – Anglican Diocese of Accra founded.
 1910 – Accra Central Station and railway line to Mangoase opened.
 1911 – Accra Hearts of Oak Sporting Club formed.
 1914 – Excelsior Orchestra formed.
 1920 – March: National Congress of British West Africa organized.
 1922 – Construction of Wesley Methodist Cathedral commenced.
 1923
 Gold Coast Hospital opens.
 Kumasi-Accra railway completed and bridge across Korle Lagoon constructed.
 Accra High School founded.
 1927 – Achimota College opens.
 1929
 National Congress of British West Africa meets in Accra.
 Gold Coast Youth Conference meeting held.
 1931 – Accra Academy established.
 1937 – Population: 72,977 (estimate).
 1939 – The 1939 Accra earthquake occurred on June 22 with a surface wave magnitude of 6.4 and a maximum Mercalli intensity of IX (Violent). Twenty-two were killed and 130 were injured, with 1,500 homes destroyed in the region. A damaging aftershock occurred on August 18, causing additional damage northeast of the city.
 1941 – U.S. military installed at Accra airfield.
 1943 – Catholic Apostolic Prefecture of Accra established.
 1945 – African Morning Post newspaper begins publication.
 1946 – Gold Coast Bulletin, Spectator Daily, and Daily Echo newspapers begins publication.
 1948
 February: 1948 Accra Riots.
 Accra Evening News and Ghana Statesman newspapers begin publication.
 University College of the Gold Coast founded.
 Population: 135,926.
 1949
 Convention People's Party headquartered in Accra.
 Gold Coast Express newspaper begins publication.
 Gold Coast Film School founded.
 1950
 Daily Graphic newspaper begins publication.
 Ghana Library Board headquartered in Accra.
 United States Information Agency resource centre established.
 1953 – Accra Municipal Council established.
 1954
 Gold Coast Broadcasting System headquartered in Accra.
 Bomaa Accra Great Olympics football club formed.
 1955 – Ghana International School founded.
 1956
 Accra Central Library established (approximate date).
 Ghanaian Arts Council headquartered in Accra.
 1957
 6 March: Accra becomes capital of independent Republic of Ghana.
 State House, National Museum of Ghana, and Independence Arch built.
 Catholic Holy Spirit Cathedral opened.
 Semi-autonomous area councils created: Ablekuma, Ashiedu Keteke, Kpeshie, Okaikwei, and Osu-Klottey (approximate date).
 Ghana Drama Studio founded.
 1958 – All-African Peoples' Conference held.
 1959 – National Symphony Orchestra Ghana, Ghana Press Club, and Ghana School of Journalism founded.
 1960
 Accra Sports Stadium opens.
 Population: 388,000 (approximate).
 1961
 Black Star Square Arch erected.
 Accra attains city status.
 Goethe-Institut branch founded.
 1962 – Ghana Dance Ensemble formed.
 1963
 Accra-Tema Development Corporation established.
 November–December: 1963 African Cup of Nations held.
 1964
 Greater Accra administrative area created.
 Boxer Muhammad Ali visits city.
 1965
 GTV (Ghana) headquartered in Accra.
 Kwame Nkrumah Conference Centre built.
 October: Organisation of African Unity summit held.
 1966 – 24 February: Coup at Flagstaff House.
 1967 – Association of African Universities headquartered in city.
 1970 – Population: 564,194 city; 738,498 urban agglomeration.
 1971 – Soul to Soul documentary film of concert at Black Star Square.
 1974 – Napoleon Night Club active.
 1975 – Union of Writers of African Peoples inaugurated in Accra.
 1978 – March: 1978 African Cup of Nations held.
 1980 – Population: 1,000,000 (estimate).
 1982 – Greater Accra Region (administrative area) created.
 1985 – W.E.B. Du Bois Memorial Centre for Pan-African Culture established.
 1987
 Accra Milo Marathon begins.
 Integrated Social Development Centre established.
 1988 – Pan-African Orchestra founded.
 1989 – Ghana Stock Exchange headquartered in Accra.
 Pan African Writers' Association (PAWA) founded.
 1990 – Population: 1,197,000 (urban agglomeration).
 1991 – Accra International Conference Centre built.
 1992
 National Theatre (Accra) opens.
 Kwame Nkrumah Memorial Park laid out.
 1993 – Centre for Policy Analysis and Artists Alliance Gallery established.
 1994 – Uniiq FM radio begins broadcasting.
 1996 – Ghanaian Chronicle newspaper begins publication.
 1998 – West Africa Network for Peacebuilding headquartered in Accra.
 1999 – Ako Adjei Interchange opens.
 2000
 January–February: 2000 African Cup of Nations held.
 Population: 1,674,000 (urban agglomeration).

21st century

 2001 – 9 May: Accra Sports Stadium disaster.
 2003 – Ghana-India Kofi Annan Centre of Excellence in ICT established.
 2004
 Stanley Nii Adjiri Blankson becomes mayor.
 Mormon Temple dedicated.
 2005 – Population: 1,985,000 (urban agglomeration).
 2006 – American International School of Accra and Nubuke Foundation founded.
 2007 – Accra International Marathon begins.
 2008 – Golden Jubilee House inaugurated.
 2009
 Alfred Vanderpuije becomes mayor.
 Population: 2,263,785 (urban agglomeration).
 2010 - Population: 1,594,419 (city proper).
 2011 – Google office in business.
 2014 – September: United Nations Mission for Ebola Emergency Response headquartered in Accra.
 3 June 2015: Flood and Fire Disaster

See also
 Accra history
 List of rulers of Gã (Nkran) (Accra, Ghana)
 Neighborhoods of Accra
 List of universities in Accra
 List of senior secondary schools in Accra
 List of hospitals in Accra
 List of radio stations in Greater Accra Region

References

Bibliography

External links

   (Bibliography of open access  articles)
  (Images, etc.)
  (Images, etc.)
  (Bibliography)
  (Bibliography)
  (Bibliography)
 

Timeline
Accra
Ghana history-related lists
Years in Ghana
Accra